The 15th Mieczysław Połukard Criterium of Polish Speedway League Aces was the 1996 version of the Mieczysław Połukard Criterium of Polish Speedway Leagues Aces. It took place on April 4 in the Polonia Stadium in Bydgoszcz, Poland.

Starting positions draw 

 Tomasz Fajfer - Start Gniezno
 Mirosław Kowalik - Apator-DGG Toruń
 Waldemar Cieślewicz - Polonia-Jutrzenka Bydgoszcz
 Roman Jankowski - Unia Leszno
 Tomasz Gollob - Polonia-Jutrzenka Bydgoszcz
 Dariusz Stenka - Wybrzeże-Rafineria Gdańsk
 Tomasz Bajerski - Apator-DGG Toruń
 Jarosław Olszewski - Polonia-Philips Piła
 Jacek Gomólski - Polonia-Jutrzenka Bydgoszcz
 Sebastian Ułamek - Włókniarz-Malma Częstochowa
 Rafał Dobrucki - Polonia-Philips Piła
 Piotr Markuszewski - GKM-Browary Bydgoskie Grudziądz
 Jacek Rempała - Unia Tarnów
 Piotr Świst - Stal-Pergo Gorzów Wlkp.
 Jacek Gollob - Polonia-Jutrzenka Bydgoszcz
 Sławomir Dudek - ZKŻ Polmos Zielona Góra
 (R1) Eugeniusz Tudzież - Polonia-Jutrzenka Bydgoszcz
 (R2) Marcin Ryczek - Polonia-Jutrzenka Bydgoszcz

Heat details

Sources 
 Roman Lach - Polish Speedway Almanac

See also 

Criterium of Aces
Mieczyslaw Polukard
Mieczysław Połukard Criterium of Polish Speedway Leagues Aces